Tsuen Wan South is one of the 19 constituencies in the Tsuen Wan District.

Created for the 2019 District Council elections, the constituency returns one district councillor to the Tsuen Wan District Council, with an election every four years.

Tsuen Wan South loosely covers residential areas including Chelsea Court, City Point, Indi Home, The Blue Yard, The Dynasty and Vision City in Tsuen Wan. It has projected population of 19,623.

Councillors represented

Election results

2010s

References

Tsuen Wan
Constituencies of Hong Kong
Constituencies of Tsuen Wan District Council
2019 establishments in Hong Kong
Constituencies established in 2019